Leaman Place is a named place in Lancaster County, Pennsylvania, United States. Leaman Place is known mostly as a whistle-stop. President-elect Abraham Lincoln spoke at this station on February 22, 1861 to a crowd of 5,000. In 1968, Hubert H. Humphrey, Democratic Party candidate for president, stopped and spoke at the same place.

The Leaman Place covered bridge crosses Pequea Creek.

Geography
Leaman Place is located at  (40.007222, -76.116667), and is 385 feet above mean sea level.

References

Unincorporated communities in Lancaster County, Pennsylvania
Unincorporated communities in Pennsylvania